Andreas Sassen (14 January 1968 – 17 October 2004) was a German professional footballer who played as a midfielder. He suffered from alcoholism and died from a stroke.

References

1968 births
2004 deaths
German footballers
Association football midfielders
Bundesliga players
2. Bundesliga players
Ukrainian Premier League players
KFC Uerdingen 05 players
Hamburger SV players
Dynamo Dresden players
FC Dnipro players
SG Wattenscheid 09 players
German expatriate footballers
German expatriate sportspeople in Ukraine
Expatriate footballers in Ukraine
Footballers from Essen